The Dalhousie Memorial Arena was a 1,280 seat multi-purpose arena in Halifax, Nova Scotia, Canada.  It was home to the Dalhousie University Tigers Ice hockey team.

The Memorial Arena saw The Dalhousie Tigers' only AUS Championship win in 1978. The Arena was demolished in 2012, in order to make room for a new multi-use building at the corner of South and Lemarchant Streets.

References

Defunct indoor arenas in Canada
Defunct indoor ice hockey venues in Canada
Demolished buildings and structures in Canada
Sports venues demolished in 2012